The Furness Railway 115 class was a class of five 4-6-4 (or Baltic) tank locomotives of the Furness Railway. They were designed by David Rutherford and built by Kitson and Company in 1920–1921. They were nicknamed "Jumbos" and the author Bob Rush gave them the unofficial classification N1. Their main duty was to haul express passenger trains between Carnforth and Whitehaven.

They were the only Baltic tank locomotives in Britain with inside cylinders, and the only ones to lack a superheater.

LMS ownership
All five passed to the London, Midland and Scottish Railway at the Grouping in 1923. The LMS gave them the classification 3P. All but one were withdrawn between 1934 and 1935, with the final member being withdrawn in 1940. All members of the class were scrapped.

Numbering

See also
 Locomotives of the Furness Railway

References

External links
 Photograph of 115

115
4-6-4T locomotives
Kitson locomotives
Railway locomotives introduced in 1920
Scrapped locomotives
2′C2′ n2t locomotives
Standard gauge steam locomotives of Great Britain